The 57th New York Film Festival took place from September 27 to October 13, 2019.

Main slate

References 

New York Film Festival
2019 film festivals
2019 in New York City